Live in Manchester is a double live album by Guns N' Roses guitarist Slash featuring Alter Bridge frontman Myles Kennedy. The album was recorded by Abbey Road Live, during Slash's solo show at the Manchester Academy on July 3, 2010. Copies of the album were limited to 1,200 with 350 being sold at the show itself.

Background
In June 2010, it was announced that the show at the Manchester Academy in Manchester, England on July 3, part of the 2010 World Tour, would be recorded and released on CD. Only 1,200 copies of the album were made available with 350 being sold after the show itself. The album was recorded, mixed and mastered "on-the-fly" during the show by Abbey Road Live. This type of recording differs from a “board” mix, which usually involves plugging into the house sound console and taking their mix, with the album quality closer to a studio mixed live album.

During the show, Slash, along with his touring band which consists of Myles Kennedy, Bobby Schneck, Todd Kerns and Brent Fitz, performed songs from his debut solo album, Slash, as well as songs from bands prominent in his career such as Guns N' Roses ("Sweet Child o' Mine", "Paradise City"), Slash's Snakepit ("Beggars & Hangers-on", "Mean Bone") and Velvet Revolver ("Fall to Pieces", "Slither"). Also performed was a cover of the Alter Bridge single "Rise Today" and Led Zeppelin's "Communication Breakdown" as well as an extended guitar solo by Slash which ended with a performance of The Godfather theme "Speak Softly Love" (listed as "Godfather" on the track listing).

In July, the recordings of the show were made available for streaming on YouTube.

Track listing

Personnel

Slash
Slash – lead guitar, slide guitar, backing vocals
Myles Kennedy – lead vocals
Bobby Schneck – rhythm guitar
Todd Kerns – bass, backing vocals
Brent Fitz – drums

Abbey Road Live
Paul Nickson – recording, mixing
Additional personnel
Caitlin Cresswell
Dan Hardingham
Holly Johnsen
Louise Downer
Margot Meyer
MJ
Noggin
Rizzo
Zach Bair

References

External links
 Slash Online

2010 live albums
Slash (musician) albums